Serapion (born November 10, 1951) is the first hierarch and bishop of the Coptic Orthodox Diocese of Los Angeles, Southern California, and Hawaii. He was born in Assiut, Kingdom of Egypt on November 10, 1951. Following his graduation from the Faculty of Medicine at Assiut in 1975, he practiced medicine in Aswan before becoming a monk.

Monastic life
He joined the Monastery of Saint Pishoy on April 8, 1979.

He was tonsured a monk on August 6, 1979, and ordained a priest on July 18, 1981 at El-Sourian Monastery. On December 23, 1982, he was assigned to serve the Coptic congregations in Zurich, Lausanne, and Geneva, Switzerland.

Bishopric of Public, Ecumenical, and Social Services
On June 2, 1985, he was ordained Bishop for the Bishopric of Public, Ecumenical, and Social Services at St. Mark Cathedral in Cairo, becoming a member of The Holy Synod of the Coptic Orthodox Patriarchate of Alexandria. During his tenure in this capacity, he established three major departments designed for 
 the growth and development of services, 
 serving the family, and 
 international relationship with other churches.

Training centers were created to educate and train 300 workers every year in various trades, which helped in improving their standard of living.  Numerous projects were started which employed a large number of those workers.  Services extended to Coptic families in rural areas and small villages where spiritual guidance, medical services, housing, and financial assistance were offered.

Bishop Serapion has represented the Coptic Orthodox Church at the International Council of Churches and has established long term relationships with other churches in the United States, Canada, and Italy. He was the first Coptic bishop invited to attend the annual conference of the Church of Scotland.

Bishop of Los Angeles

On November 14, 1995, at Saint Mark's Cathedral at Anba Rowiss, Abbassia, Egypt, Pope Shenouda III consecrated Serapion to be Bishop of the Diocese of Los Angeles, Southern California, and Hawaii.

On December 23, 1995, he was enthroned by Bishops Sarabamon, Hedra, Roweiss, Mittaous, Youssef, and Karas as Bishop of the Diocese of Los Angeles, Southern California, and Hawaii at Holy Virgin Mary Church in Los Angeles.

Visit to the Vatican

On Wednesday, May 8, 2013, Bishop Serapion traveled to the Vatican to join a delegation of Coptic Orthodox bishops accompanying Pope Tawadros II in a historic visit to meet Pope Francis of the Roman Catholic Church.

Pope Tawadros' visit marks the first official visit by the Pope of Alexandria to the Pope of Rome in over 40 years, since Pope Shenouda III met with Pope Paul VI in 1973 and began ecumenical dialogue. This was also Tawadros's first trip outside of Egypt since his election to the papacy in November 2012.

Elevation to Metropolitan
On February 28, 2016, at Anba Roweiss, Abbassia, Egypt, Pope Tawadros II elevated Bishop Serapion to the episcopal dignity of Metropolitan. Pope Tawadros II also called bishops Abraham and Kyrillos to assist Metropolitan Serapion.

On February 15, 2019, Bishop Suriel also relocated to assist Metropolitan Serapion in the service of the Diocese.

See also
 Coptic Orthodox Church in the United States
 Coptic Orthodox Diocese of Los Angeles, Southern California, and Hawaii
Holy Synod of the Coptic Orthodox Church

References

External links
 Gallery of the Coptic Holy Synod of Egypt (All Coptic Bishops)
 Coptic Orthodox Diocese of Los Angeles | The Official Website of the Diocese under the Auspices of Metropolitan Serapion
 Home | St. Mary & St. Verena Coptic Orthodox Church

Living people
1951 births
Coptic Orthodox bishops
Coptic Orthodox Church in the United States